Veniamin Alekseyevich Bayazov (born 24 March 1997) is a Russian football player who plays for FC Metallurg Lipetsk.

Club career
He made his debut in the Russian Football National League for FC Metallurg Lipetsk on 31 July 2021 in a game against FC Neftekhimik Nizhnekamsk.

References

External links
 
 
 Profile by Russian Football National League

1997 births
Sportspeople from Lipetsk
Living people
Russian footballers
Association football midfielders
FC Metallurg Lipetsk players
Russian First League players
Russian Second League players